Comotia is a monotypic snout moth genus described by Harrison Gray Dyar Jr. in 1914. It is known from Mexico. It contains the species Comotia torsicornis, described by the same author, found in Panama.

References

Phycitinae
Monotypic moth genera
Moths of North America